Col de la Croix-Morand (also known as Col de Dyane) (el. 1401 m.) is a high mountain pass of the Massif Central in France, in the department of Puy de Dôme, near Clermont-Ferrand. It inspired a song by Jean-Louis Murat.

Details of climb
Starting from the junction of D 983 and D 996 (west) (near Mont-Dore), the Col de la Croix Morand is 4.5 km long. Over this distance, the climb is 207 m. (an average of 4.6%). The steepest section is 6.6%.

Starting from Lac Chambon (east), the climb is 10.5 km long. Over this distance, the climb is 511 m. (an average of 4.9%). The steepest section is 8.2%.

Appearances in Tour de France
The Tour de France has crossed the pass six times, the first time in 1951.

External links
Le col de Dyane ou de la Croix-Morand dans le Tour de France (French)
Profile of the climb from the west on www.climbbybike.com
Profile of the climb from Lac Chambon on www.climbbybike.com

Croix
Transport in Auvergne-Rhône-Alpes
Mountain passes of the Massif Central
Landforms of Puy-de-Dôme